Gnome-Pie is a circular application launcher for Linux created by Simon Schneegans.

It is made of several pies, each consisting of multiple slices. The user presses a key stroke which opens the desired pie. By activating one of its slices, applications may be launched, key presses may be simulated or files can be opened. The user does not need to remember the name of an application – just the direction has to be remembered.

License change
Version 0.7.1 and earlier was published under the GPL.

See also
 Comparison of applications launchers

References

Application launchers
Free software programmed in Vala
2018 software